Grace Episcopal Church is an Episcopal Church in Alexandria, Virginia, in the Episcopal Diocese of Virginia.  Grace Episcopal Church is a center for worship and fellowship, a school for discipleship and stewardship and a community for healing and outreach.

History 
The church was founded in 1855 by members of Christ Church and St. Paul's Episcopal Church who wanted to start another Episcopal Church in the expanding West end of Alexandria. The parish's original founding statement says "where all may come without regard for temporal estate, freely and without fee, as brethren come one to another."  This was in contrast to the common practice at the time for parishioners to pay a pew tax. During the American Civil War, the church's building was used as a hospital. It was associated with the Oxford Movement.

After World War II, the parish expanded and moved to Alexandria's outskirts, constructing the current church building in gothic style in 1948. A grade school was added in 1959 in the parish education wing.

Current practice
Today, the parish continues to proclaim itself to be a place "where all may worship freely by God's grace." The parish is inclusive, and welcomes all persons. The parish also includes La Gracia, a liturgy for Spanish-speaking members. La Gracia meets on Sunday mornings at 9:00 am in the parish hall.

Grace Episcopal School accepts children ages 3 years old to 5th grade of all faiths and ethnicities.

Worship 
Grace Church considers itself to be High Church by tradition. The Eucharist is the center of worship at Grace Church, and is celebrated several times per week. The weekly Eucharist schedule includes services on Sunday at 7:30 am, 9 am, 11:15 am, and 5:00 pm, as well as Tuesday at 6:30 pm, Wednesday mornings at 7:30 am and Thursdays at 12:15 pm. Grace Church uses both Rite I and Rite II from the Book of Common Prayer for worship services, and conducts one 9 am Eucharist on Sundays in Spanish.  Worship times vary in the summer, and during the seasons of Lent and Advent.

Architecture 
The current church building was constructed in 1948.  It has nineteen stained glass windows, including 6 in the Nave.  The stained glass windows were made by Willet Hauser Architectural Glass, a leader in the Gothic Revival movement and creator of many of the windows in the National Cathedral, as well as the West Point chapel and other notable buildings. The twelve windows in the Nave portray twelve prominent church figures, including:

 Paul of Tarsus
 Athanasius
 Augustine of Hippo
 Bede
 Dunstan
 Anselm of Canterbury
 Francis of Assisi
 Thomas Aquinas
 William Laud
 Samuel Seabury, first bishop of The Episcopal Church
 Edward Pusey
 Bishop Fabian of the Anglican Diocese of Trinidad and Tobago

The stained glass window in the narthex is a rose window and contains the symbol for the Anglican Communion with the words, "the truth shall make you free."

The pulpit is wood carved, and shows images of five great British evangelists:

 St. Patrick
 St. Margaret of Scotland
 Thomas Becket
 John Donne
 C. S. Lewis

External links
 Grace Episcopal Church website
 Grace Episcopal School website
 Book of Common Prayer

Episcopal churches in Virginia
Anglo-Catholic church buildings in the United States
Episcopal schools in Virginia
Private elementary schools in Virginia
Religious organizations established in 1855
Churches in Alexandria, Virginia
1855 establishments in Virginia